Sneed is a ghost town in Jackson County, Arkansas, United States. On April 10, 1929, an F5 tornado destroyed the town, killing 23 people.

History

William Sneed and his family moved from Illinois and settled here following the Civil War.

Sneed Church and Sneed School were located next to each other in this rural farm community.

1929 tornado

In the late afternoon of April 10, 1929, an F5 tornado, the highest rating on the Fujita scale, struck northern Jackson County—the only tornado of this intensity ever documented in Arkansas. Many residents saw the tornado approach and took shelter in storm cellars, under a road bridge, in a barn, or in a chicken house.

It then crossed into Jackson County in the Black River bottoms, likely north of Centerville. The tornado began to weaken after it passed and then moved southeast of Alicia.

Roads were blocked by large timbers and other debris, and the tornado's heavy rains made them very muddy, hindering rescue efforts. The death toll was listed at 23, and many others were seriously injured. A makeshift morgue was set up in Swifton.

All that remains today of Sneed is a clearing where the school and church formerly stood.

See also
List of F5 and EF5 tornadoes
List of ghost towns in Arkansas

References

Ghost towns in Arkansas
Geography of Jackson County, Arkansas
F5 tornadoes
Natural disaster ghost towns